Kordi Shirazi (also Romanized as Kordī Shīrāzī; also known as Kordī) is a village in Rudkhaneh Bar Rural District, Rudkhaneh District, Rudan County, Hormozgan Province, Iran. At the 2006 census, its population was 2,178, in 440 families.

References 

Populated places in Rudan County